is a national highway connecting Muroran, Hokkaido and  Urakawa, Hokkaido in Japan.

Route description
Length: 
Origin: Muroran, Hokkaido
Terminus: Urakawa, Hokkaido (Terminates at junction with National Route 236 and National Route 336 
Major cities: Muroran, Noboribetsu, Tomakomai

History
18 May 1953: Second Class National Highway 235 from Muroran to Urakawa
1 April 1965: First Class National Highway 235

Passes through
Hokkaidō Prefecture
Iburi Subprefecture
Muroran, Hokkaidō
Noboribetsu, Hokkaidō
Shiraoi District, Hokkaidō
 Shiraoi, Hokkaidō
Tomakomai, Hokkaidō
Yūfutsu District, Hokkaidō
 Atsuma, Hokkaidō
 Mukawa, Hokkaidō
Hidaka Subprefecture
Saru District, Hokkaidō
 Hidaka, Hokkaidō
Niikappu District, Hokkaidō
 Niikappu, Hokkaidō
Hidaka District, Hokkaidō
 Shinhidaka, Hokkaidō
Urakawa District, Hokkaidō
 Urakawa, Hokkaidō

References

  Japanese Wikipedia article

235
Roads in Hokkaido